Propebela eurybia is a species of sea snail, a marine gastropod mollusk in the family Mangeliidae,.

Description
The length of the shell attains 7.4 mm, its diameter 2.8 mm.

Distribution
This species occurs in the Sea of Japan.

References

 P Bartsch. "The Nomenclatorial Status of Certain Northern Turritid Mollusks"; Proceedings of the biological Society of Washington 54, 1–14, 1941
 Higo, Shun'ichi, Paul Callomon, and Yoshihiro Gotō. Catalogue and bibliography of the marine shell bearing mollusca of Japan: Gastropoda, Bivalvia, Polyplacophora, Scaphopoda. Elle Scientific, 1999.

External links
 

eurybia
Gastropods described in 1941